Tidimalo Innocentia Legwase is a South African politician for the African National Congress. She has been a member of the National Assembly since 2019.

Parliamentary career
Legwase stood as an ANC parliamentary candidate from the North West in the 2019 parliamentary election, and was elected to the National Assembly and sworn in on 22 May 2019.

In June 2019, Legwase was named to the Portfolio Committee on Defence and Military Veterans, the Portfolio Committee on Home Affairs and the Joint Standing Committee on Defence.

In June 2021, she became a member of the Committee for Section 194 Enquiry. The committee will determine Public Protector Busisiwe Mkhwebane's fitness to hold office.

References

External links

Profile at Parliament of South Africa

Living people
Year of birth missing (living people)
Place of birth missing (living people)
Tswana people
African National Congress politicians
Members of the National Assembly of South Africa
Women members of the National Assembly of South Africa